Varangian may refer to one of these:
Varangians, the term for Norse Vikings who were active in Eastern Europe
Member of the Varangian Guard
Russian term for Catholics in the 12th and 13th century
Russian term for Scandinavians until the second half of the 12th century
Russian name of the Baltic Sea up to the 18th century
The Varangian Way, the second full-length album from Viking metallers Turisas
Related to the Varanger Peninsula, Norway
Sturtian-Varangian, a glacial episode approximately 700 million years ago, named after Varanger